Hymenolepis is a genus of cyclophyllid tapeworms responsible for hymenolepiasis. They are parasites of humans and other mammals. The focus in this article is in Hymenolepis commonly parasitizing humans.

Species include:
 Hymenolepis apodemi - in rodents
 Hymenolepis asymetrica — in rodents
 Hymenolepis diminuta — in humans
 Hymenolepis horrida — in rodents
 Hymenolepis rymzhanovi - in rodents
 Hymenolepis microstoma — in rodents
 Hymenolepis nana — in humans

Signs and symptoms 
Most infections do not have many worms and therefore can have no symptoms.  Patients with more than 15,000 eggs per gram of stool may experience cramps, diarrhea, irritability, anorexia, or enteritis caused by cystercoids destroying the intestinal villi in which they develop. [1]

Cause 
Hymenolepiasis is the most common cestode infection in humans. Infections are seen more often among children. It is most widespread in warm climates and around unsanitary areas where eggs can be passed through fecal matter from an infected host to an uninfected person.

Hymenolepiasis is caused by the introduction of either tapeworm species Hymenolepis nana (H. nana) or Hymenolepis diminuta (H. diminuta) into the human body. A member of the cestode class, tapeworms do not have digestive tracts to absorb nutrients, instead their surface body layer is metabolically active with nutrients and waste passing in and out continuously. In contrast, the nematodes class, such as hookworms, have complete digestive tracts and separate orifices for food ingestion and waste excretion. Although the cestode life cycle requires the cysticercoid, or larval, phase to be developed in an intermediate host, H. nana does not follow this observation and can use an intermediate host or auto infect the human host.

Life cycle 
Hymenolepis nana is an auto-infecting parasite that does not require an intermediate host. It can, however, grow in rats as well.  The fertilized eggs pass in the stool from an infected host.  The eggs are then either eaten by an insect or by a human which mainly occurs through the ingestion of contaminated food or water. The cysticercoid stage develops either outside the body in an insect that can then be eaten by a human or a rat, or it develops in the intestinal villus of an auto-infected human.  The adult phase begins with the growth of the scolex with several hooks.  After attaching itself to the intestinal wall and growing proglottids, fertilized eggs can pass in the host’s stool as the gravid proglottids deteriorate and release eggs. [3]

Hymenolepis diminuta fertilized eggs pass in the stool from an infected host.  The eggs are then eaten by grain beetles where the cysticerci, or larval stage develops.  Humans then can eat the bug or its mealworm phase in cereal or flour.  The worm matures in the duodenum, the first portion of the small intestine, and attach to the mucosa lining. Fertilized eggs can pass in the host’s stool as the gravid proglottids deteriorate and release eggs. [3]

Morphology 

Hymenolepis nana worms are flat and segmented with skinny necks. They vary in length from approximately 15 to 40 mm and are 1 mm wide.  Each worm has a scolex, which is an anterior ‘head’ segment with a single row of 20-30 retractable hooks (rostellum).  Each worm also has proglottids, which are wider segments of the tapeworm that contains both male and female reproductive organs. [1, 3]  Each mature segment has unilateral genital pores and 3 testes.  When the eggs have been fertilized the segments are referred to as gravid.  These break off from the main portion, the strobila, and deteriorate releasing eggs.  The oncospheres, or embryos, can be from 30-47 µm in diameter and are covered with a thin hyaline outer membrane and a thicker inner membrane.  Embedded in the inner membrane on polar sides of the oncosphere are a number of hair-like filaments. [1]

Hymenolepis diminuta worms are the same shape as H. nana but are much larger, up to 90 cm long and 44 mm wide.  Their scolex does not have hooked rostellum like the H. nana species but they do have similar unilateral genital pores and 3 testes per proglottid.  The oncospheres of H. diminuta are similar to H. nana’s except they lack hair like filaments embedded in their inner membrane and are two times their size. [1]

Diagnosis 

Diagnosis for hymenolepiasis is done by examining stool for eggs.  The proglottids that are disintegrated in the intestine cannot be detected.  Egg output can be sporadic so a couple of stool tests a few days apart may be needed to diagnose the infection.

Pathogenesis 

Hymenolepis nana eggs are passed through the stool of human hosts. These eggs are then consumed by rats or humans through contaminated food or water. H. diminuta is thought to be passed to humans most often through the ingestion of insects in dried grains or cereal.[1] Research done in 2000 showed that of nine pet stores surveyed in Connecticut U.S.A., 75% sold rats, mice or hamsters infected with H. nana. A serious public health risk could result from pet store parasite transmissions[2]. Humans or rodents can be the reservoir of H. nana. H. diminuta, the reservoirs are rodents and insects (specifically flour beetles, Tribulium species).[3,1] Hymenolepis has no vectors.

Hymenolepis nana'''s larval stage occurs either inside an auto infected host's intestinal villus or an intermediate rat host. In H. diminuta, this stage occurs only in grain beetles. It lasts about 5–6 days then the worm matures and attaches itself to the last part of the small intestine. The whole time period from egg ingestion until adult worms releasing new fertilized eggs in stool is 20 to 30 days.[1]

 Treatment Hymenolepis nana:

For adults there are 3 options.

 Praziquantel given once, 25mg/kg.
 Nitazoxanide given at a dose of 500 mg for 3 days.
 Niclosamide given for one day at 2 grams followed by six days at 1 gram.

For children there are treatment 3 options.

 Praziquantel given once, 25mg/kg.
 Nitazoxanide given at a dose of 100 mg for 3 days (for children ages 1-3) or 200 mg for 3 days (for children ages 4-11).
 Niclosamide given for one day at 1 gram followed by six days at 0.5 grams. [3]Hymenolepis diminuta:

For adults there are 2 options.

 Praziquantel given once, 25mg/kg.
 Niclosamide given for one day at 2 grams followed by six days at 1 gram.

For children there are treatment 2 options.

 Praziquantel is given once, 25mg/kg.
 Niclosamide given for one day at 1 gram followed by six days at 0.5 grams. [3]

 Epidemiology 
Prevalence in endemic areas can reach from 5-20%[1].  H. nana is the most common cestode in humans with infection prevalence highest among children and in warm arid climates with poor sanitation facilities [1].  Results of case studies completed on each continent suggest that H. nana is a difficult parasite to eliminate.  The prevalence of H. nana in remote communities in northwest Australia is remarkably high, 55%.  The transmission is due mostly from human to human contact and auto-infection [9].  In Bat Dambang, Cambodia, middle school students were found to have a 2.4% prevalence, more than the younger kids at 1.3%, suggesting children are not learning prevention techniques as they mature[8].

A study done in Turkey comparing Shantytown schools with Apartment schools showed a higher prevalence in the Shantytowns, 13.6% in males and 15.0% in females, as opposed to Apartment schools which still had a significant prevalence of 2.2% in males and 8.4% in females. Children were presenting with anemia, intestinal worms, and stunted growth raising public health concerns.  Recommendations were made for schools to administer de-worming medication and provide iron supplements to the students [7].

In 2006, a study in rural Mexico found that 25% of the children ages 6-10 in twelve schools were infected with H. nana.  The study indicates that socioeconomic factors and lack of parent education are strong influences on the high prevalence rate.  Recommendations were made to include mothers in de-worming campaigns because drugs alone were not eliminating the parasites [5].

Zimbabwe children in both small towns and high-density suburbs suffer from H. nana.  Infections tend to be more frequent in younger children who live in urban areas and in older children who live in rural locations.  The study reported an overall prevalence rate of 24% in urban areas and an 18% prevalence in rural towns [6].

Six communities along the banks of Lake Titicaca in Peru were included in a study to determine the distribution of parasites.  The prevalence of H. nana was found to be 6.6% but the overall intestinal pathogenic infection prevalence rate was 91.2% with many subjects having up to 5 different types of parasites![4]

 History Hymenolepis nana was first identified as a human parasite by Von Siebold in 1852.  In 1906, Stiles identified an identical parasite with a rodent host and named it Hymenolepis fraterna. Later, morphological characteristics were used for taxonomy identification and H. nana was known to have hooks and linear reproductive organs.  H. diminuta'' has no hooks and reproductive organs arranged in a triangular formation. [1]

References 

General Information:

1. Schantz, Peter M. (2006). “Tapeworms (Cestodiasis).” Gastroenterology Clinics of North America. Vol.25, iss.3, p. 637-653.

2. Duclos, LM; Richardson, DJ (2000). “Hymenolepis Nana in Pet Store Rodents.” Comparative Parasitology. Vol.67, iss. 2, p. 197-201.

Case Studies:

South America

3. Maco Flores, Vicente, Marcos Raymundo, Luis A., Terashima Iwashita, Angélica et al. (2002) “Distribución de la Entereoparasitosis en el Altiplano Peruano: Estudio en 6 comunidades rurales del departamento de Puno, Perú.” Rev. gastroenterol. Perú, oct./dic. Vol.22, No.4, p. 304-309.

North America

4. Luis Quihui, Mauro E Valencia, David WT Crompton, Stephen Phillips, Paul Hagan, Gloria Morales, Silvia P Díaz-Camacho (2006). “Role of the employment status and education of mothers in the prevalence of intestinal parasitic infections in Mexican rural schoolchildren.” BMC Public Health, Vol.6, p. 225.

Africa

5. Peter R. Mason, Barbara A. Patterson. (1994). “Epidemiology of Hymenolepis nana Infections in Primary School Children in Urban and Rural Communities in Zimbabwe.” The Journal of Parasitology. Vol. 80, No. 2, p. 245-250.

Europe

6. Ulukanligil, M. Seyrek, A. (2004). “Anthropometric status, anaemia and intestinal helminthic infections in shantytown and apartment schoolchildren in the Sanliurfa province of Turkey.  European Journal of Clinical Nutrition. Vol. 58, iss. 7, p 1056-1061.

Asia

7. Seung Kyu Park, Dong-Heui Kim, Young-Kun Deung, Hun-Joo Kim, Eun-Ju Yang,
Soo-Jung Lim, Yong-Suk Ryang, Dan Jin, and Kyu-Jae Lee. (2004). “Status of intestinal parasite infections among children in Bat Dambang, Cambodia.” The Korean Journal of Parasitology. Vol. 42, No. 4, p. 201-203.

Australia

8. Macnish, Marion. (2001). “Characterization of Community-Derived Hymenolepis in Australia.” Murdoch University Medical Science Thesis.

9. Grupo de Estadio para la Formacion y Docencia en Enfermedades Infecciosas https://web.archive.org/web/20090306220546/http://www.gefor.4t.com/parasitologia/hymenolepis.html

Cestoda
Cestoda genera
Parasitic helminths of humans